Brush Creek Township is an inactive township in Gasconade County, in the U.S. state of Missouri.

Brush Creek Township was established in 1858, most likely taking its name Brush Creek.

References

Townships in Missouri
Townships in Gasconade County, Missouri